Darryl James Briskey (born 24 August 1955) is a former Australian politician. Born in Roma, Queensland, he was a teacher before entering politics. In 1978, he joined the Cleveland branch of the Labor Party. In 1989, he was elected to the Legislative Assembly of Queensland as the Labor member for Redlands, transferring to Cleveland in 1992. He continued to represent the seat until his retirement in 2006.

Briskey unsuccessfully contested the 2013 federal election for the Australian Labor Party in the electorate of Bowman, against the Liberal National Party incumbent, Andrew Laming.

References

1955 births
People from Roma, Queensland
Members of the Queensland Legislative Assembly
Living people
Australian Labor Party members of the Parliament of Queensland
21st-century Australian politicians